Hugo Folch of Cardona and Gandía, known as "the Navarrese" (?, ~1405 - ?, ~1470) was Duke of Gandía (1425-1433) and gentleman of Guadalest. He was son of the count of Cardona Juan Ramón Folch and of Cardona, and Joana of Gandía. In 1412, due to the death of his maternal grandfather Alfonso of Aragon and Foix, he inherited the Señoría of Ondara and Gandia.

Gandia was very active the sugar industry. Hugo of Cardona possessed the monopoly to exploit sugar in Gandia. He sold the business during the second half of the 15th century to the  stockists of the Magna Societas Alemannorum of Ravensburg.

From his mother he inherited, Calasanz and Sanui in Ribagorza, and Guadalest and Confrides in the Kingdom of Valencia. He received the barony of Guadalest in the inheritance of his mother. In 1424 he joined the king Alfonso V of Aragon in Kingdom of Naples. He established himself in Valencia, where in 1476 he litigated against his son Juan. In 1427 Hugo de Cardona married Blanca of Navarre, lady of Caparrosso, Aézcoa, Carazar and Caseda, daughter of Juana of Navarra who was natural daughter of the king Charles II of Navarre.

With this wife he had four children: 
 Juan of Cardona and of Navarra baron of Guadalest and greater butler of Charles III of Navarre.
 Beatriz of Cardona.
 Onofre of Cardona, baron of Guadalest, married Beatriu Bou, of the family Bou, gentlemen of Callosa and Tàrbena.

References 

House of Aragon
Dukes of Spain